Mary Ward may refer to:

Scientists and academics
 Mary Ward (nurse) (1884–1972) English nurse to the boat people on the waterways
 Mary Ward (scientist) (née King, 1827–1869) Irish amateur scientist, was killed by an experimental steam car
 Mary Alice Ward (1896–1972), Australian teacher and pastoralist

Writers
 Mary Ward (suffragist) (1851–1933) Irish-born Cambridge based Women's activist. lecturer and writer
 Mary Augusta Ward (1851–1920), British activist and novelist, known by her married name of Mrs Humphry Ward
 Mary Ward Centre, an adult education college located in London named for the above Mary Augusta Ward
 Mary Jane Ward (1905–1981), American novelist
 Mary Ward Brown (1917–2013), American writer

Entertainers
 Mary Ward (actress) (1915–2021), Australian actress and radio broadcaster
 Mary Mae Ward, a fictional character on the American ABC TV serial General Hospital, played by Rosalind Cash

Other 
 Mary Ward (nun) (1585-1645), English Catholic nun who founded the Institute of the Blessed Virgin Mary
 Mary Ward Catholic Secondary School, an educational college in Scarborough, Canada, named for the English Catholic nun
 Mary Ward (book), a biography of the nun Mary Ward by Ida Friederike Görres
 Mary Ward (ship), a passenger and cargo steamer built in Montreal, Canada in 1865, wrecked in a storm in 1872

Ward, Mary